W. Forster is the name of:
 Walter Forster (entomologist) (1910–1986), German entomologist
 Wilhelm Julius Foerster (1832–1921), German astronomer